The 1987 Southwest Conference women's basketball tournament was held March 4–7, 1987, at Moody Coliseum in Dallas, Texas. 

Number 1 seed  defeated 2 seed  72-70 to win their 5th championship and receive the conference's automatic bid to the 1987 NCAA tournament.

Format and seeding 
The tournament consisted of a 6 team single-elimination tournament. The top two seeds had a bye to the Semifinals.

Tournament

References 

Southwest Conference women's Basketball Tournament
1987 in women's basketball
1987 in sports in Texas
Basketball in Dallas